Robert M. Feustel House is a historic home located at Fort Wayne, Indiana. It was built in 1927, and consists of a series of irregularly intersecting two-story, Tudor Revival style hip-roofed masses.  It features polygonal chimney stacks, half-timbering with herringbone brick infill, and diagonal projections at the juncture of the wings. It was built by Robert M. Feustel, a locally prominent entrepreneur.

It was listed on the National Register of Historic Places in 1980.

References

Houses on the National Register of Historic Places in Indiana
Houses completed in 1927
Tudor Revival architecture in Indiana
National Register of Historic Places in Fort Wayne, Indiana
Houses in Fort Wayne, Indiana